Tevfik Doğukan Pala (born 10 July 1992) is a Turkish professional footballer who plays as a left back for TFF Second League club Adıyaman FK.

Life and career
Pala began his career with Beşiktaş in 2005. He was taken to Under 18 team in 2008.  He signed his professional contract on 25 January 2011.  He made his professional debut on 11 March 2011 against Manisaspor. He was loaned to Adana Demirspor for 2011-12 season.

References

External links

1992 births
People from Eminönü
Footballers from Istanbul
Living people
Turkish footballers
Turkey youth international footballers
Association football defenders
Beşiktaş J.K. footballers
Adana Demirspor footballers
İstanbulspor footballers
Ümraniyespor footballers
Anadolu Üsküdar 1908 footballers
Nazilli Belediyespor footballers
Süper Lig players
TFF Second League players
TFF Third League players